Chutla Peak is a summit on the crest of the Tatoosh Range which is a sub-range of the Cascade Range. It's located south of Mount Rainier within Mount Rainier National Park. The mountain's name "Chutla" derives from Chinook Jargon which means "rock".  Precipitation runoff on the  peak drains into the Nisqually River.

Climate
Chutla Peak is located in the marine west coast climate zone of western North America. Most weather fronts originate in the Pacific Ocean, and travel northeast toward the Cascade Mountains. As fronts approach, they are forced upward by the peaks of the Cascade Range (Orographic lift), causing them to drop their moisture in the form of rain or snowfall onto the Cascades. As a result, the west side of the North Cascades experiences high precipitation, especially during the winter months in the form of snowfall. Due to its temperate climate and proximity to the Pacific Ocean, areas west of the Cascade Crest very rarely experience temperatures below  or above . During winter months, weather is usually cloudy, but, due to high pressure systems over the Pacific Ocean that intensify during summer months, there is often little or no cloud cover during the summer. Because of maritime influence, snow tends to be wet and heavy, resulting in high avalanche danger.

References

External links
 National Park Service web site: Mount Rainier National Park

Cascade Range
Mountains of Lewis County, Washington
Mountains of Washington (state)
Chinook Jargon place names
North American 1000 m summits